Burkholderia brasilensis is a species of Pseudomonadota.

Burkholderiaceae